Jakarta Football Club 1928 was a professional association football club based in Jakarta, Indonesia which competed in the Liga Primer Indonesia and Indonesian Premier League (IPL). 

In 2011, the club was illegally profiteering identity of "Persija Jakarta" and thus coexisted with another Persija Jakarta that competed in the Indonesian Super League (ISL). After the IPL was disbanded, signifying the end of dualism in Indonesian football, the club became defunct on 25 March 2013.

The club's kits were supplied by Mitre.

Season-by-season records

Past seasons 

Key
 Tms. = Number of teams
 Pos. = Position in league

Last squad

Team officials

References

External links
Persija logo
Website Indonesian Premier League

Football clubs in Indonesia
Defunct football clubs in Indonesia
Association football clubs established in 2010
2010 establishments in Indonesia
Association football clubs disestablished in 2013
2013 disestablishments in Indonesia